Buist Martin Fanning III (born May 26, 1949) is an American scholar of biblical Greek and professor of New Testament studies at Dallas Theological Seminary. He was one of the translators who worked on the 1995 update of the New American Standard Bible. Fanning earned his BA (1970) from the College of Charleston, his ThM (1974) from Dallas Theological Seminary, and his DPhil (1987) from Oxford University.

Works

Thesis

Books

as Editor

References

1949 births
Living people
New Testament scholars
Translators of the Bible into English
Dallas Theological Seminary faculty
College of Charleston alumni
Alumni of the University of Oxford
American biblical scholars